Henry Mauran was an acting Minister of State for Monaco on two occasions. The first term was between January 1932 and June 1932, while the second term was between June 1937 and August 1937.

References 

Ministers of State of Monaco
1899 births
1983 deaths